Al-Shula is a football club playing in Aden, Yemen.

Achievements
South Yemeni League
1989/90

References

Sport in Aden
Football clubs in Yemen
Association football clubs established in 1968
1968 establishments in South Yemen